In organic chemistry, an aromatic amine is an organic compound consisting of an aromatic ring attached to an amine.  It is a broad class of compounds that encompasses anilines, but also many more complex aromatic rings and many amine substituents beyond .  Such compounds occur widely.

Aromatic amines are widely used as precursor to pesticides, pharmaceuticals, and dyes.

Aromatic amines in textiles 

Since August 2012, the new standard EN 14362-1:2012 Textiles - Methods for determination of certain aromatic amines derived from azo colorants - Part 1: Detection of the use of certain azo colorants accessible with and without extracting the fibres is effective. It had been officially approved by the European Committee for Standardization (CEN) and supersedes the test standards EN 14362-1: 2003 and EN 14362-2: 2003.

The standard describes a procedure to detect EU banned aromatic amines derived from azo colorants in textile fibres, including natural, man-made, regenerated, and blended fibres. The standard is also relevant for all coloured textiles, e.g. dyed, printed, and coated textiles.

See also 
 Aromatic hydrocarbons

References 

 An acute case of primary aromatic amines migrating from cooking utensils, Memorandum for the Danish Veterinary and Food Administration, 2004 October 12